Madygenophlebiidae is an extinct family of rock crawlers in the order Grylloblattodea. There are at least two genera and four described species in Madygenophlebiidae.

Genera
These two genera belong to the family Madygenophlebiidae:
 † Madygenophlebia Storozhenko, 1992
 † Micromadygenophlebia Storozhenko, 1992

References

Grylloblattodea
Prehistoric insect families